The 2013 Canada Summer Games is a national multi-sport event that was held in Sherbrooke, Quebec from August 2, 2013 to August 17, 2013. These Games were the first Canada Summer Games to be held in Quebec, and third overall after the inaugural Canada Winter Games in Quebec City in 1967 and the 1983 Canada Winter Games in Saguenay.

Medal table
The following is the medal table for the 2013 Canada Summer Games.

Sports
269 events in 17 different sports were contested. The only change at these Games involved dropping rugby sevens and replacing it with fencing (which was moved over from the Canada Winter Games.

Numbers in parentheses indicate the number of medal events proposed to be contested in each sport/discipline.

 Aquatics
 
 
 
 
 
 Canoeing
 Canoe sprint (34)
 Cycling
 Mountain biking (6)
 Road (6)
 
 
 
 
 Soccer (2)
 
 
 
 Volleyball 
 
 
 Wrestling
 Freestyle (26)

Venues
List of venues as follows:
Atto Beaver Park: Beach volleyball
Bishop's University: Basketball, Soccer
Cegep de Sherbrooke - Centre de l'activité physique: Fencing, Wrestling
Centre récréatif de Rock Forest: Tennis
Sherbrooke: Cycling
Lac des Nations: Canoe-Kayak
Lac Magog: Rowing, Sailing
Lac Memphrémagog: Open Water Swimming
Milby Golf Club: Golf
Mont Bellevue: Mountain Bike
Palais des Sports: Basketball
Parc Bureau: Softball
Parc Desranleau: Softball
Parc de l'Est: Baseball
Stade Julien Morin: Baseball
Parc Sylvie-Daigle: Soccer
Stade Amédée-Roy: Baseball
Université de Sherbrooke: Athletics, Diving, Soccer, Swimming, Volleyball

Participating provinces and territories
All 13 provinces and territories competed.
 
 
 

 
 
  
 
 

 (Hosts)

References

External links
Official Website

 
Canada Summer Games
Canada Games
Sport in Sherbrooke
Summer Games
Summer Games